Jackman Flats Provincial Park is a provincial park in British Columbia, Canada, comprising approximately 615 ha. and located just southeast of Tête Jaune Cache in the Rocky Mountain Trench, near the Yellowhead Pass. The park features several hiking trails.

References

Robson Valley
Provincial parks of British Columbia
2000 establishments in British Columbia
Protected areas established in 2000